

Games list (W–Z)

There are currently  games across the lists of PlayStation Vita games. 

For a chronological list, click the sort button in any of the available region's columns. Games dated December 17, 2011 (JP), February 15, 2012 (NA), and February 22, 2012 (EU) are launch titles of each region respectively.

See also 
 List of PlayStation Vita games (A-D)
 List of PlayStation Vita games (E–H)
 List of PlayStation Vita games (I–L)
 List of PlayStation Vita games (M–O)
 List of PlayStation Vita games (P–R)
 List of PlayStation Vita games (S)
 List of PlayStation Vita games (T–V)

Notes

References

,W-Z
,W-Z
Vita, W-Z